Heliocharis is a monotypic genus of damselflies in the family Dicteriadidae. It contains the single species Heliocharis amazona. It is native to South America, where it is distributed from Venezuela to Argentina.

References 

Calopterygoidea
Zygoptera genera
Monotypic Odonata genera
Odonata of South America
Taxa named by Edmond de Sélys Longchamps